Xymene plebeius is a species of sea snail, a marine gastropod mollusk in the family Muricidae, the murex snails or rock snails.

Distribution
This marine species occurs off New Zealand.

References

 Beu, A.G. & Maxwell, P.A. (1990) Cenozoic Mollusca of New Zealand. New Zealand Geological Survey Paleontological Bulletin, 58, 1–518

Gastropods of New Zealand
Gastropods described in 1873
Xymene